Eduard Torok (born 2 May 1997) is a Romanian ski jumper who also competed for Hungary.

Career 

He started his career at CSS Dinamo Râșnov club. Torok made his World Cup debut in Sapporo in 2014, where he finished in 45th position, competed for Romania. After he started to compete for  Hungary, he also switched the club and now performing for Koszegi Sport Egyesulet, a Hungarian ski club.

World Cup

Standings

Individual starts (1)

References

External links

1997 births
Living people
Romanian male ski jumpers
Sportspeople from Brașov